Švehlík (feminine Švehlíková) is a Czech and Slovak surname. Notable people with the surname include:
 Aleš Švehlík, Czech paralympic athlete
 Alois Švehlík, Czech actor
 David Švehlík, Czech actor
 Ján Švehlík, Slovak footballer

Czech-language surnames
Slovak-language surnames